Hie may refer to:
 Hie (pronoun), an Old English pronoun
 Hie Shrine, a Shinto shrine in Tokyo, Japan
 Hie Station, in Nishiwaki, Hyōgo Prefecture, Japan
 Health information exchange
 Highlands and Islands Enterprise
 Holiday Inn Express
 Hunan Institute of Engineering, in Xiangtan, Hunan, China
 Hypoxic ischaemic encephalopathy
 Kodak High-Speed Infrared (also known as Kodak HIE), an infrared photographic film
 Mount Washington Regional Airport, in New Hampshire, United States